Lucky Omeruo (born 15 September 1995) is a Nigerian professional  footballer who currently plays for Belgian club KSC City Pirates as a striker.

Career

Club career
Lucky Omeruo is the younger brother of former Chelsea F.C. center back Kenneth Omeruo. Lucky is a  pacy forward player who won the league with his team at the end of the 2015 season. He has been with the U-20 national team of Nigeria under coach Obuh and presently has been invited for the U-23 Olympic team of Nigeria.

In January 2020, Omeruo moved to Belgian amateur club Bilzerse Waltwilder. Six months later, he joined fellow belgian club, KSC City Pirates.

References

External links
Lucky Omeruo at Footballdatabase

http://www.omroepwest.nl/sport/12-07-2013/ado-tester-lucky-omeruo-terug-naar-nigeria
http://www.mynewswatchtimesng.com/lucky-omeruo-thrilled-with-u-23-call-up/
http://africanfootball.com/news/527556/Lucky-Omeruo-makes-history-in-Malta
http://www.sl10.ng/news/articles/categories/nigeria-players-abroad/lucky-omeruo-eyes-summer-move-away-from-the-tiny-island-of-malta/206974

1995 births
Living people
Nigerian footballers
Nigerian expatriate footballers
Maltese Premier League players
A Lyga players
Tercera División players
Bayelsa United F.C. players
Wikki Tourists F.C. players
Birkirkara F.C. players
Pembroke Athleta F.C. players
Tarxien Rainbows F.C. players
St. George's F.C. players
FK Palanga players
CD Leganés B players
Association football forwards
Nigerian expatriate sportspeople in Malta
Nigerian expatriate sportspeople in Spain
Nigerian expatriate sportspeople in Lithuania
Nigerian expatriate sportspeople in Belgium
Expatriate footballers in Malta
Expatriate footballers in Spain
Expatriate footballers in Lithuania
Expatriate footballers in Belgium
People from Abuja